Ilya, Iliya, Ilia, Ilja, or Ilija (or , ; ,) is the East Slavic form of the male Hebrew name Eliyahu (Eliahu), meaning "My God is Yahu/Jah." It comes from the Byzantine Greek pronunciation of the vocative (Ilía) of the Greek Elias (Ηλίας, Ilías). It is pronounced with stress on the second syllable. The diminutive form is Iliusha or Iliushen'ka. The Russian patronymic for a son of Ilya is "Ilyich", and a daughter is "Ilyinichna".

People with the name

Real people
Ilya (Archbishop of Novgorod), 12th-century Russian Orthodox cleric and saint
Ilya Ivanovitch Alekseyev (1772–1830), commander of the Russian Imperial Army
Ilya Borok (born 1993), Russian jiujitsu fighter
Ilya Bryzgalov (born 1980), Russian ice hockey goalie
Ilya Ehrenburg (1891–1967), Russian writer and Soviet cultural ambassador
Ilya Glazunov (1930–2017), Russian painter
Ilya Gringolts (born 1982), violinist
Ilya Grubert (born 1954), violinist
Ilya Ilf (1897–1937), Russian author of Twelve Chairs and the Golden Calf
Ilya Ilyin (born 1988), Kazakhstani Olympic weightlifter
Ilya Ivashka (born 1994), Belarusian tennis player
Ilya Kabakov (born 1933), Russian-American conceptual artist of Jewish origin
Ilya Kaler (born 1963), violinist
Ilya Kaminsky (born 1977), Ukrainian-American-Jewish poet
Ilya Kovalchuk (born 1983), Russian ice hockey winger in the KHL and formerly the NHL for the Atlanta Thrashers, New Jersey Devils, L.A. Kings and Washington Capitals
Ilya Kuvshinov (born 1990), animator
Ilya Lagutenko (born 1968), lead singer of the Russian rock band Mumiy Troll
Ilya Lobanov (born 1996), Kazakhstani ice hockey player
Ilya Espino de Marotta, Marine engineer and leader of the Panama Canal Expansion Project
Ilya Mechnikov (1845–1916), Russian Nobel Prize-winning microbiologist
Ilya Petrov (born 1995), Russian footballer
Ilya Prigogine (1917–2003), physical chemist and Nobel Prize-winning physicist
Ilya Piatetski-Shapiro (1929–2009), Russian-Jewish-Israeli mathematician
Ilya Yashin (born 1983), Russian political figure
Ilya Yefimovich Repin (1844–1930), Russian painter
Ilya Salkind (born 1947), movie producer
Ilya Salmanzadeh (born 1986), Persian-Swedish music producer
Ilya Samsonov (born 1997), a Russian goaltender for the Washington Capitals
Ilya Sorokin (born 1995), a Russian goaltender for the New York Islanders
Ilya Strebulaev, Russian-American financial economist
Ilya Sutskever, computer scientist
Ilya Tsipursky (1934–2022), Soviet judoka and sambist
Ilya Ulyanov (1831–1886), father of Soviet revolutionary Vladimir Lenin
Ilya Zhitomirskiy (1989–2011), Russian-American founder of Diaspora
Ilya Serov (born 1986), Russian-American trumpeter and singer
Ilya Dzhirkvelov (born 1927), author and KGB defector

Religious figures
Ilya Muromets, Orthodox monastic saint, Russian folk hero
Elijah, a Hebrew prophet of the ninth century BCE, known in Russian as Iliya the Prophet (Илия́ Проро́к)
Ali or Eli (Arabic name), a cousin and son-in-law of the Islamic prophet Muhammad, and the first Imam of shiahs. (There is a quote from Imam Ali "I am called Elya / Alya among Jews, Elia among Christians, Ali for my father, and Haydar for my mother".)

Fictional characters
Ilya Pasternak, fictional character from the video game Ace Combat 6: Fires of Liberation
Illya Kuryakin, a main character in the TV show The Man from U.N.C.L.E.
Ilya Tretiak, a character in the 1997 film The Saint
Ilya in the book Letters from Rifka
Ilya, a character in the book and film adaption Heaven Knows What
Ilya Afanasyevich Shamrayev, a character in Anton Chekhov's The Seagull
Ilya Stepanovich Igolkin, a character in Vladimir Obruchev's Plutonia
Ilya (Ilyusha) Snegiryov, a character in Fyodor Dostoevsky's The Brothers Karamazov
Ilya, Also known as Julian Devorak, plague doctor from "The Arcana"
Illyasviel von Einzbern, a character in Fate series by Type-Moon

See also
Elia (disambiguation)
Eli
Ilyin
Ilyinka
Ilyinsky (disambiguation)
Ilyino

References

Russian masculine given names